Mikael Frank Dorsin (born 6 October 1981) is a Swedish former professional footballer who played as a left-back. He is the current Sporting Director of Rosenborg. Starting his career with Djurgårdens IF in the late 1990s, he went on to represent RC Strasbourg, Rosenborg, and CFR Cluj before retiring from professional football in 2016. A full international between 2001 and 2010, he won 16 caps for the Sweden national team and was a part of their UEFA Euro 2008 squad.

Club career 
Dorsin started his career at minor-league IFK Lidingö. After that he played for Djurgårdens IF (until 1999), Spårvägens FF (1999), Djurgårdens IF (2000–2003), RC Strasbourg (2003–2004), Rosenborg BK (2003–2007) and CFR Cluj, before he returned to Rosenborg in August 2008. On 27 May 2016, he decided to hang up his boots at the age of 34 due to a long-term knee injury.

International career 
Dorsin played 16 matches for Sweden national team and was a squad player at Euro 2008.

Personal life 
He is the younger brother of Swedish comedian and actor Henrik Dorsin.

Career statistics

Honours
Djurgårdens IF
 Allsvenskan: 2002, 2003
Swedish Cup: 2002
Superettan: 2000
Division 1 Norra: 1998

Rosenborg
 Norwegian League: 2004, 2006, 2009,  2010,  2015

CFR Cluj
 Romanian League: 2008
 Romanian Cup: 2007-08
Individual
 Årets Järnkamin: 2000

References

External links

National caps for Sweden 

1981 births
Living people
Swedish footballers
Sweden international footballers
Sweden under-21 international footballers
Sweden youth international footballers
Rosenborg BK players
RC Strasbourg Alsace players
Djurgårdens IF Fotboll players
CFR Cluj players
Liga I players
Expatriate footballers in Romania
Expatriate footballers in France
Expatriate footballers in Norway
Swedish expatriate sportspeople in Norway
Swedish expatriate footballers
Swedish expatriate sportspeople in Romania
Allsvenskan players
Superettan players
Eliteserien players
Ligue 1 players
UEFA Euro 2008 players
Association football defenders
Footballers from Stockholm